Mari State University was founded in   1972 in Yoshkar-Ola, Mari El Republic. Mari State University consists of 6 faculties and 6 institutes that train well-educated specialists for most sectors of the Russian national economy. Mari State University is one of the five founder members of the International Association of Finno-Ugric universities, one of the forty-one members of Russia's Association of Classical Universities.
Classes are taken in Russian medium and English medium.

Institutions

Institute of Agricultural Technologies
Institute of Economics, Management and Finances
The Institute of Medicine and Natural science
Institute of National Culture and Intercultural Communication
Institute of Additional Professional Education
Institute of Pedagogics and Psychology

Faculties
Faculty of medical science
Faculty of Physics and Mathematics
Faculty of Foreign Languages
Faculty of Law
Faculty of History and Philology
Faculty of Physical Education, Sport and Tourism
Faculty of Electrical Engineering

References

External links 

 Official website

Educational institutions established in 1972
Universities in Volga Region
Education in Mari El
Yoshkar-Ola
Cultural heritage monuments in Mari El
Objects of cultural heritage of Russia of federal significance